Robert Littledyke (5 July 1913 – 1990) was an English professional footballer who played in the Football League for Lincoln City and Mansfield Town.

References

1913 births
1990 deaths
English footballers
Association football forwards
English Football League players
Lincoln City F.C. players
Grantham Town F.C. players
Mansfield Town F.C. players